Great Habton is a village and former civil parish about 18 miles from York, now in the parish of Habton, in the Ryedale district, in the county of North Yorkshire, England. In 1961 the parish had a population of 103.

Amenities 
Great Habton has a church called St Chad and a pub called The Grapes Inn.

History 
The name "Habton" means 'Hab(b)a's farm/settlement'. Great Habton was recorded in the Domesday Book as Abbetune/Abetune/Habetun. Great Habton was formerly a township in the parish of Kirby Misperton, from 1866 Great Habton was a civil parish in its own right, on 1 April 1986 the parish was abolished and merged with Little Habton and Ryton to form Habton.

References

External links 

Villages in North Yorkshire
Former civil parishes in North Yorkshire
Ryedale